Luigi de Franchis, C.R. (died 1617) was a Roman Catholic prelate who served as Bishop of Nardò (1611–1617) and Bishop of Vico Equense (1607–1611).

Biography
Luigi de Franchis was ordained a priest in the Congregation of Clerics Regular of the Divine Providence. On 1 October 1607, he was appointed during the papacy of Pope Paul V as Bishop of Vico Equense. On 24 January 1611, he was appointed during the papacy of Pope Paul V as Bishop of Nardò. He served as Bishop of Nardò until his death in 1617.

See also
Catholic Church in Italy

References

External links and additional sources
 (for Chronology of Bishops) 
 (for Chronology of Bishops)  
 (for Chronology of Bishops) 
(for Chronology of Bishops) 

17th-century Italian Roman Catholic bishops
Bishops appointed by Pope Paul V
1617 deaths
Theatine bishops